George Clarke is a film director from Northern Ireland and the founder of Yellow Fever Productions. He is known for creating low-budget horror films; his 2011 film The Last Light was filmed on a budget of £200.

Career 
In October 2007 Clarke launched Yellow Fever Productions. The following year Clarke released his first film, Battle of the Bone, about a zombie attack on Belfast. The movie won the Audience Choice award at the Freak Show Film Festival in Orlando, Florida. Clarke released his second zombie film, The Knackery, in 2009 and in 2011, released The Last Light, which centered upon a maintenance man who must seal up a haunted abandoned old peoples home. The film's lead actor, Robert Render, won the award for Best Actor at the 2011 Freak Show Horror Film Festival. Per Clarke, the film had a budget of £200.

The following year Clarke released the horror-comedy film Splash Area, which was awarded Best SFX and the Jury's Choice Awards at the 2012 Freak Show Horror Film Festival. Clarke followed this up with the release of the 2013 thriller film Onus and the 2015 film The Blood Harvest.

Filmography

References

External links
 

Living people
Film directors from Northern Ireland
Year of birth missing (living people)